The Whitney Awards are awards given annually for novels by LDS authors.  Established in 2007, they are named after Orson F. Whitney, a prominent early member of the LDS Church. There are several categories for which novels may be nominated. The Whitney Awards are a semi-independent non-profit organization affiliated with the LDStorymakers, a guild for LDS authors.

Categories
Due to the limited number of titles released by LDS authors, several of the genre awards have been combined (such as romance and women's fiction).  
 
, there are eight genre categories:

Adult
Romance
Mystery/Suspense
Speculative
Historical
General

Youth
Youth General
Youth Speculative
Middle Grade

There are also two special awards:
Best Novel by a New Author
Novel of the Year

The Whitney Committee states that it is unlikely that other areas of LDS art—such as music, poetry, or non-fiction books—will be added to the categories.

Process
To be eligible, a novel must be written by an LDS author during the award year, and be at least 50,000 words long. Any reader can nominate a book.  Once a book has received five or more nominations, it becomes an official nominee.  The official nominees are presented to the Whitney Awards Committee which checks for eligibility and acts as a preliminary judging panel, reducing the number of nominees to no more than five per category.

Finally, ballots are sent to the Whitney Awards Academy, an invitation-only group consisting of authors, bookstore owners/managers, distributors, critics, and other industry professionals.  By a popular vote, they decide on the winners. The awards are presented at a dinner held at the conclusion of the annual LDStorymakers conference and writing "boot camp."

Until the 2010 awards (presented 2011), books were not allowed to win in more than one category.

Name
The awards are named after Orson F. Whitney, a member of the Quorum of the Twelve Apostles in the Church of Jesus Christ of Latter-day Saints as well as a poet and writer.  In 1888, Elder Whitney delivered a speech entitled "Home Literature" in which he stated:

We will yet have Miltons and Shakespeares of our own. God's ammunition is not exhausted. His brightest spirits are held in reserve for the latter times. In God's name and by his help we will build up a literature whose top shall touch heaven, though its foundations may now be low in earth.

The phrase "We will yet have Miltons and Shakespeares of our own" has been adopted as the slogan of the Whitney Awards, and is printed on the trophy.

Winners and finalists 2007 - present

Committee
The Whitney Awards Committee acts as both the organizers and the preliminary judges of the Whitney Awards.  Rules stipulate that the committee be made up of at least four members of LDStorymakers.  Their positions are temporary, by invitation of the Whitney Awards Committee president (who is appointed by the LDStorymakers executive committee).

The 2009 committee included:

 Robison Wells, president
 Julie Coulter Bellon
 Danyelle Ferguson
 John Ferguson
 Crystal Leichty
 Sheila Staley
 Jaime Theler

The 2011 committee included:

 Josi S. Kilpack, president
 Annette Lyon
 Heather B. Moore
 Jana Parkin
 Sarah M. Eden
 Luisa Perkins

The 2015 committee were:

 Jaime Theler, president
 Kaylee Baldwin
 Marion Jensen
 Nancy Campbell Allen
 Heather Justesen
 Deborah Talmadge-Bickmore
 Kimberly Vanderhorst

The 2017 committee:

Peggy Eddleman, president
Janet Sumner Johnson
Josi S. Kilpack
Monique Luetkemeyer
Jeremy Maughan
E.B. Wheeler
Michelle Wilson
Jared Garrett

Although Kerry Blair had been a member of the Whitney Awards Committee for two years, the other members of the committee "went behind her back" to name her the winner of a Lifetime Achievement Award for 2008.

Reception
One Mormon literature critic initially raised concerns with the heavy involvement of authors published by Covenant Communications in the awards process. However, when the finalists for 2007 were announced, this same commenter noted both that there was a wide spectrum of publishers represented, and that "Covenant publishes the lion's share of Mormon market fiction." This same critic later described the awards as "at best a reductive form of validation and criticism. Although let's be honest: The Whitneys have way more credibility than the Grammys."

After the 2011 nominations, criticism of the nomination process was common, though appreciation of the Whitney Awards themselves was also common.

See also
 AML Awards
 LDS fiction

Notes

References

External links
 Official website of the Whitney Awards
 Storymakers Conference, organizing body for the Whitney Awards
 

American literary awards
 Whitney Awards
 Whitney Awards
Mormon literature
Awards established in 2007
2007 establishments in the United States